Salem Town railway station is a railway station on the Salem–Virudhachalam railway line in Salem district, Tamil Nadu, India.

References 

Salem railway division
Railway stations in Salem district